The 2015–16 Texas Longhorns men's basketball team represented the University of Texas at Austin in the 2015–16 NCAA Division I men's basketball season. They were led by head coach Shaka Smart who was in his first year. The team played their home games at the Frank Erwin Center in Austin, Texas, and were members of the Big 12 Conference. They finished the season 20–13, 11–7 in Big 12 play, to finish in fourth place. They lost in the quarterfinals of the Big 12 tournament to Baylor. They received an at-large bid to the NCAA tournament where they lost in the first round to Northern Iowa on a half-court buzzer-beater from Northern Iowas’s Paul Jesperson.

Previous season
The Longhorns finished the season 20–14, 8–10 in Big 12 play, to finish in 7th place. They advanced to the second round of the Big 12 tournament where they lost to Iowa State. Texas received an at-large bid to the NCAA tournament in which they lost to Butler in the second round. On March 29, 2015, previous coach Rick Barnes was fired after 17 seasons at Texas, during which he compiled a record of 402–180, by far the most wins for a head coach in program history. Barnes accepted the same position at Tennessee four days later.

Departures

Recruiting

Recruiting class of 2016

Roster

Schedule

|-
!colspan=12 style="background:#CC5500; color:white;"| Exhibition

|-
!colspan=12 style="background:#CC5500; color:white;"| Regular season

|-
!colspan=12 style="background:#CC5500; color:white;"| Big 12 Tournament

|-
!colspan=12 style="background:#CC5500; color:white;"| NCAA tournament

Rankings

*AP does not release post-NCAA tournament rankings

See also
2015–16 Texas Longhorns women's basketball team

References

Texas
Texas Longhorns men's basketball seasons
Texas
2015 in sports in Texas
2016 in sports in Texas